William Muir Kelly (14 August 1922 – 11 July 1996) was a Scottish professional footballer who played as a centre half for Dunfermline Athletic, Airdrieonians, Blackburn Rovers, Mossley, Accrington Stanley and Darwen. His younger brother Walter Kelly was also a professional footballer; their father and two more brothers played at a lower level in Fife.

References

1922 births
1996 deaths
Scottish footballers
Footballers from Fife
People from Cowdenbeath
Dunfermline Athletic F.C. players
Airdrieonians F.C. (1878) players
Blackburn Rovers F.C. players
Mossley A.F.C. players
Accrington Stanley F.C. (1891) players
Darwen F.C. players
Scottish Football League players
English Football League players
Association football defenders